Southern Born Killers is an album by Stuck Mojo. The initial version of the album was released as both a CD and as a free download from the band's website on April 23, 2007. The album was released internationally on March 4, 2008.
This is the first album with new vocalist Lord Nelson, who had replaced the departed Bonz.

Track listing
"I'm American" (Nelson/Ward) — 3:00
"Southern Born Killers" (Nelson/Ward) — 4:10
"The Sky Is Falling" (Nelson/Aborn/Ward/Frampton) — 5:53
"Metal Is Dead" (Ward/Nelson/Aborn) — 4:14
"For the Cause of Allah" 4:35 (Ward) —
"Open Season" (Ward/Nelson/Aborn/Frampton) — 7:19
"Prelude to Anger" (Ward) — 1:04
"That's When I Burn" (Nelson/Ward) — 4:02
"Yoko" (Ward/Nelson) — 7:47
"Home" (Nelson/Ward/Archie) — 4:41

Bonus tracks on international release
"Go" (Nelson/Ward) — 3:35
"The Fear Is All Around Me" (Nelson/Ward) — 5:32
"This Is How We Swing" (Nelson/Ward) — 3:23

References

2007 albums
Albums free for download by copyright owner
Stuck Mojo albums
Napalm Records albums